Tilma  may refer to:

 Tilmàtli (also Tilma), outer garment
Tilma of Guadalupe, alternate name of the cloak affiliated with Our Lady of Guadalupe 
 Trade, Investment and Labour Mobility Agreement